In ordinary language, a crime is an unlawful act punishable by a state or other authority. The term crime does not, in modern criminal law, have any simple and universally accepted definition, though statutory definitions have been provided for certain purposes. The most popular view is that crime is a category created by law; in other words, something is a crime if declared as such by the relevant and applicable law. One proposed definition is that a crime or offence (or criminal offence) is an act harmful not only to some individual but also to a community, society, or the state ("a public wrong"). Such acts are forbidden and punishable by law.

The notion that acts such as murder, rape, and theft are to be prohibited exists worldwide. What precisely is a criminal offence is defined by the criminal law of each relevant jurisdiction. While many have a catalogue of crimes called the criminal code, in some common law nations no such comprehensive statute exists.

The state (government) has the power to severely restrict one's liberty for committing a crime. In modern societies, there are procedures to which investigations and trials must adhere. If found guilty, an offender may be sentenced to a form of reparation such as a community sentence, or, depending on the nature of their offence, to undergo imprisonment, life imprisonment or, in some jurisdictions, death. 

Usually, to be classified as a crime, the "act of doing something criminal" (actus reus) mustwith certain exceptionsbe accompanied by the "intention to do something criminal" (mens rea).

While every crime violates the law, not every violation of the law counts as a crime. Breaches of private law (torts and breaches of contract) are not automatically punished by the state, but can be enforced through civil procedure.

Overview 

When informal relationships prove insufficient to establish and maintain a desired social order, a government or a state may impose more formalized or stricter systems of social control. With institutional and legal machinery at their disposal, agents of the state can compel populations to conform to codes and can opt to punish or attempt to reform those who do not conform.

Authorities employ various mechanisms to regulate (encouraging or discouraging) certain behaviors in general. Governing or administering agencies may for example codify rules into laws, police citizens and visitors to ensure that they comply with those laws, and implement other policies and practices that legislators or administrators have prescribed with the aim of discouraging or preventing crime. In addition, authorities provide remedies and sanctions, and collectively these constitute a criminal justice system. Legal sanctions vary widely in their severity; they may include (for example) incarceration of temporary character aimed at reforming the convict. Some jurisdictions have penal codes written to inflict permanent harsh punishments: legal mutilation, capital punishment, or life without parole.

Usually, a natural person perpetrates a crime, but legal persons may also commit crimes. Historically, several premodern societies believed that non-human animals were capable of committing crimes, and prosecuted and punished them accordingly.

The sociologist Richard Quinney has written about the relationship between society and crime. When Quinney states "crime is a social phenomenon" he envisages both how individuals conceive crime and how populations perceive it, based on societal norms.

Etymology 

The word crime is derived from the Latin root , meaning "I decide, I give judgment". Originally the Latin word crīmen meant "charge" or "cry of distress". The Ancient Greek word , with which the Latin crimen is cognate, typically referred to an intellectual mistake or an offense against the community, rather than a private or moral wrong.

In 13th century English crime meant "sinfulness", according to the Online Etymology Dictionary. It was probably brought to England as Old French  (12th century form of Modern French crime), from Latin crimen (in the genitive case: criminis). In Latin, crimen could have signified any one of the following: "charge, indictment, accusation; crime, fault, offense".

The word may derive from the Latin cernere – "to decide, to sift" (see crisis, mapped on Kairos and Chronos). But Ernest Klein (citing Karl Brugmann) rejects this and suggests *cri-men, which originally would have meant "cry of distress". Thomas G. Tucker suggests a root in "cry" words and refers to English plaint, plaintiff, and so on. The meaning "offense punishable by law" dates from the late 14th century. The Latin word is glossed in Old English by facen, also "deceit, fraud, treachery", [cf. fake]. Crime wave is first attested in 1893 in American English.

Definition

Legalism 

In the scope of law, crime is defined by the criminal law of a given jurisdiction, including all actions that are subject to criminal procedure. There is no limit to what can be considered a crime in a legal system, so there may not be a unifying principle used to determine whether an action should be designated as a crime.

Legislatures can pass laws (called mala prohibita) that define crimes against social norms. These laws vary from time to time and from place to place: note variations in gambling laws, for example, and the prohibition or encouragement of duelling in history. Other crimes, called mala in se, count as outlawed in almost all societies, (murder, theft and rape, for example).

English criminal law and the related criminal law of Commonwealth countries can define offences that the courts alone have developed over the years, without any actual legislation: common law offences. The courts used the concept of malum in se to develop various common law offences.

In the military sphere, authorities can prosecute both regular crimes and specific acts (such as mutiny or desertion) under martial-law codes that either supplant or extend civil codes in times of (for example) war. Many constitutions contain provisions to curtail freedoms and criminalize otherwise tolerated behaviors under a state of emergency in case of war, natural disaster or civil unrest. Undesired activities at such times may include assembly in the streets, violation of curfew, or possession of firearms.

Sociology 

A normative definition views crime as deviant behavior that violates prevailing normscultural standards prescribing how humans ought to behave normally. This approach considers the complex realities surrounding the concept of crime and seeks to understand how changing social, political, psychological, and economic conditions may affect changing definitions of crime and the form of the legal, law-enforcement, and penal responses made by society.

These structural realities remain fluid and often contentious. For example: as cultures change and the political environment shifts, societies may criminalise or decriminalise certain behaviours, which directly affects the statistical crime rates, influence the allocation of resources for the enforcement of laws, and (re-)influence the general public opinion.

Similarly, changes in the collection and/or calculation of data on crime may affect the public perceptions of the extent of any given "crime problem". All such adjustments to crime statistics, allied with the experience of people in their everyday lives, shape attitudes on the extent to which the state should use law or social engineering to enforce or encourage any particular social norm. Behaviour can be controlled and influenced by a society in many ways without having to resort to the criminal justice system.

Indeed, in those cases where no clear consensus exists on a given norm, the drafting of criminal law by the group in power to prohibit the behaviour of another group may seem to some observers an improper limitation of the second group's freedom, and the ordinary members of society have less respect for the law or laws in generalwhether the authorities actually enforce the disputed law or not.

Foundational systems

Natural-law theory 
Justifying the state's use of force to coerce compliance with its laws has proven a consistent theoretical problem. One of the earliest justifications involved the theory of natural law. This posits that the nature of the world or of human beings underlies the standards of morality or constructs them. Thomas Aquinas wrote in the 13th century: "the rule and measure of human acts is the reason, which is the first principle of human acts". He regarded people as by nature rational beings, concluding that it becomes morally appropriate that they should behave in a way that conforms to their rational nature. Thus, to be valid, any law must conform to natural law and coercing people to conform to that law is morally acceptable. In the 1760s, William Blackstone described the thesis:

 "This law of nature, being co-eval with mankind and dictated by God himself, is of course superior in obligation to any other. It is binding over all the globe, in all countries, and at all times: no human laws are of any validity, if contrary to this; and such of them as are valid derive all their force, and all their authority, mediately or immediately, from this original."

But John Austin (1790–1859), an early positivist, applied utilitarianism in accepting the calculating nature of human beings and the existence of an objective morality. He denied that the legal validity of a norm depends on whether its content conforms to morality. Thus in Austinian terms, a moral code can objectively determine what people ought to do, the law can embody whatever norms the legislature decrees to achieve social utility, but every individual remains free to choose what to do. Similarly, H.L.A. Hart saw the law as an aspect of sovereignty, with lawmakers able to adopt any law as a means to a moral end.

Thus the necessary and sufficient conditions for the truth of a proposition of law involved internal logic and consistency, and that the state's agents used state power with responsibility. Ronald Dworkin rejects Hart's theory and proposes that all individuals should expect the equal respect and concern of those who govern them as a fundamental political right. He offers a theory of compliance overlaid by a theory of deference (the citizen's duty to obey the law) and a theory of enforcement, which identifies the legitimate goals of enforcement and punishment. Legislation must conform to a theory of legitimacy, which describes the circumstances under which a particular person or group is entitled to make law, and a theory of legislative justice, which describes the law they are entitled or obliged to make.

There are natural-law theorists who have accepted the idea of enforcing the prevailing morality as a primary function of the law. This view entails the problem that it makes any moral criticism of the law impossible: if conformity with natural law forms a necessary condition for legal validity, all valid law must, by definition, count as morally just. Thus, on this line of reasoning, the legal validity of a norm necessarily entails its moral justice.

One can solve this problem by granting some degree of moral relativism and accepting that norms may evolve over time and, therefore, one can criticize the continued enforcement of old laws in the light of the current norms. People may find such law acceptable, but the use of state power to coerce citizens to comply with that law lacks moral justification. More recent conceptions of the theory characterise crime as the violation of individual rights.

Since society considers so many rights as natural (hence the term right) rather than man-made, what constitutes a crime also counts as natural, in contrast to laws (seen as man-made). Adam Smith illustrates this view, saying that a smuggler would be an excellent citizen, "...had not the laws of his country made that a crime which nature never meant to be so."

Natural-law theory therefore distinguishes between "criminality" (which derives from human nature) and "illegality" (which originates with the interests of those in power). Lawyers sometimes express the two concepts with the phrases malum in se and malum prohibitum respectively. They regard a "crime malum in se" as inherently criminal; whereas a "crime malum prohibitum" (the argument goes) counts as criminal only because the law has decreed it so.

It follows from this view that one can perform an illegal act without committing a crime, while a criminal act could be perfectly legal. Many Enlightenment thinkers (such as Adam Smith and the American Founding Fathers) subscribed to this view to some extent, and it remains influential among so-called classical liberals and libertarians.

Religion 

Different religious traditions may promote distinct norms of behaviour, and these in turn may clash or harmonise with the perceived interests of a state. Socially accepted or imposed religious morality has influenced secular jurisdictions on issues that may otherwise concern only an individual's conscience. Activities sometimes criminalized on religious grounds include (for example) alcohol consumption (prohibition), abortion and stem-cell research. In various historical and present-day societies, institutionalized religions have established systems of earthly justice that punish crimes against the divine will and against specific devotional, organizational and other rules under specific codes, such as Roman Catholic canon law and Islamic Shariah Law.

Criminalization 

One can view criminalization as a procedure deployed by society as a preemptive harm-reduction device, using the threat of punishment as a deterrent to anyone proposing to engage in the behavior causing harm. The state becomes involved because governing entities can become convinced that the costs of not criminalizing (through allowing the harms to continue unabated) outweigh the costs of criminalizing it (restricting individual liberty, for example, to minimize harm to others).

States control the process of criminalization because:
 Even if victims recognize their own role as victims, they may not have the resources to investigate and seek legal redress for the injuries suffered: the enforcers formally appointed by the state often have better access to expertise and resources.
 The victims may only want compensation for the injuries suffered, while remaining indifferent to a possible desire for deterrence.
 Fear of retaliation may deter victims or witnesses of crimes from taking any action. Even in policed societies, fear may inhibit from reporting incidents or from co-operating in a trial.
 Victims, on their own, may lack the economies of scale that could allow them to administer a penal system, let alone to collect any fines levied by a court. Garoupa and Klerman (2002) warn that a rent-seeking government has as its primary motivation to maximize revenue and so, if offenders have sufficient wealth, a rent-seeking government will act more aggressively than a social-welfare-maximizing government in enforcing laws against minor crimes (usually with a fixed penalty such as parking and routine traffic violations), but more laxly in enforcing laws against major crimes.
 As a result of the crime, victims may die or become incapacitated.

Labelling theory 

The label of "crime" and the accompanying social stigma normally confine their scope to those activities seen as injurious to the general population or to the state, including some that cause serious loss or damage to individuals. Those who apply the labels of "crime" or "criminal" intend to assert the hegemony of a dominant population, or to reflect a consensus of condemnation for the identified behavior and to justify any punishments prescribed by the state (if standard processing tries and convicts an accused person of a crime).

History 
Some religious communities regard sin as a crime; some may even highlight the crime of sin very early in legendary or mythological accounts of originsnote the tale of Adam and Eve and the theory of original sin. What one group considers a crime may cause or ignite war or conflict. However, the earliest known civilizations had codes of law, containing both civil and penal rules mixed together, though not always in recorded form.

Ancient Near East 
The Sumerians produced the earliest surviving written codes. Urukagina (reigned , short chronology) had an early code that has not survived; a later king, Ur-Nammu, left the earliest extant written law system, the Code of Ur-Nammu, which prescribed a formal system of penalties for specific cases in 57 articles. The Sumerians later issued other codes, including the "code of Lipit-Ishtar". This code, from the 20th century BCE, contains some fifty articles, and scholars have reconstructed it by comparing several sources. 

Successive legal codes in Babylon, including the code of Hammurabi, reflected Mesopotamian society's belief that law derived from the will of the gods (see Babylonian law).
Many states at this time functioned as theocracies, with codes of conduct largely religious in origin or reference. In the Sanskrit texts of Dharmaśāstra, issues such as legal and religious duties, code of conduct, penalties and remedies, etc. have been discussed and forms one of the elaborate and earliest source of legal code.

Sir Henry Maine studied the ancient codes available in his day, and failed to find any criminal law in the "modern" sense of the word. While modern systems distinguish between offences against the "state" or "community", and offences against the "individual", the so-called penal law of ancient communities did not deal with "crimes" (Latin: crimina), but with "wrongs" (Latin: delicta). Thus the Hellenic laws treated all forms of theft, assault, rape, and murder as private wrongs, and left action for enforcement up to the victims or their survivors. The earliest systems seem to have lacked formal courts.

Rome and its legacy in Europe 

The Romans systematized law and applied their system across the Roman Empire. Again, the initial rules of Roman law regarded assaults as a matter of private compensation. The most significant Roman law concept involved dominion. The pater familias owned all the family and its property (including slaves); the pater enforced matters involving interference with any property. The Commentaries of Gaius (written between 130 and 180 AD) on the Twelve Tables treated furtum (in modern parlance: "theft") as a tort.

Similarly, assault and violent robbery involved trespass as to the pater's property (so, for example, the rape of a slave could become the subject of compensation to the pater as having trespassed on his "property"), and breach of such laws created a vinculum juris (an obligation of law) that only the payment of monetary compensation (modern "damages") could discharge. Similarly, the consolidated Teutonic laws of the Germanic tribes, included a complex system of monetary compensations for what courts would  consider the complete range of criminal offences against the person, from murder down.

Even though Rome abandoned its Britannic provinces around 400 AD, the Germanic mercenarieswho had largely become instrumental in enforcing Roman rule in Britanniaacquired ownership of land there and continued to use a mixture of Roman and Teutonic Law, with much written down under the early Anglo-Saxon kings. But only when a more centralized English monarchy emerged following the Norman invasion, and when the kings of England attempted to assert power over the land and its peoples, did the modern concept emerge, namely of a crime not only as an offence against the "individual", but also as a wrong against the "state".

This idea came from common law, and the earliest conception of a criminal act involved events of such major significance that the "state" had to usurp the usual functions of the civil tribunals, and direct a special law or privilegium against the perpetrator. All the earliest English criminal trials involved wholly extraordinary and arbitrary courts without any settled law to apply, whereas the civil (delictual) law operated in a highly developed and consistent manner (except where a king wanted to raise money by selling a new form of writ). The development of the idea that the "state" dispenses justice in a court only emerges in parallel with or after the emergence of the concept of sovereignty.

In continental Europe, Roman law persisted, but with a stronger influence from the Christian Church. Coupled with the more diffuse political structure based on smaller feudal units, various legal traditions emerged, remaining more strongly rooted in Roman jurisprudence, but modified to meet the prevailing political climate.

In Scandinavia the effect of Roman law did not become apparent until the 17th century, and the courts grew out of the thingsthe assemblies of the people. The people decided the cases (usually with largest freeholders dominating). This system later gradually developed into a system with a royal judge nominating a number of the most esteemed men of the parish as his board, fulfilling the function of "the people" of yore.

From the Hellenic system onwards, the policy rationale for requiring the payment of monetary compensation for wrongs committed has involved the avoidance of feuding between clans and families. If compensation could mollify families' feelings, this would help to keep the peace. On the other hand, the institution of oaths also played down the threat of feudal warfare. Both in archaic Greece and in medieval Scandinavia, an accused person walked free if he could get a sufficient number of male relatives to swear him not guilty. (Compare the United Nations Security Council, in which the veto power of the permanent members ensures that the organization does not become involved in crises where it could not enforce its decisions.)

These means of restraining private feuds did not always work, and sometimes prevented the fulfillment of justice. But in the earliest times the "state" did not always provide an independent policing force. Thus criminal law grew out of what 21st-century lawyers would call torts; and, in real terms, many acts and omissions classified as crimes actually overlap with civil-law concepts.

The development of sociological thought from the 19th century onwards prompted some fresh views on crime and criminality, and fostered the beginnings of criminology as a study of crime in society. Nietzsche noted a link between crime and creativityin The Birth of Tragedy he asserted: "The best and brightest that man can acquire he must obtain by crime". In the 20th century, Michel Foucault in Discipline and Punish made a study of criminalization as a coercive method of state control.

Types 
The following classes of offences are used, or have been used, as legal terms:
 Offence against the person
 Violent offence
 Sexual offence
 Offence against property

Researchers and commentators have classified crimes into the following categories, in addition to those above:
 Forgery, personation and cheating
 Firearms and offensive weapons
 Offences against the state/offences against the Crown and Government, or political offences
 Harmful or dangerous drugs
 Offences against religion and public worship
 Offences against public justice, or offences against the administration of public justice
 Public order offence
 Commerce, financial markets and insolvency
 Offences against public morals and public policy
 Motor vehicle offences
 Conspiracy, incitement and attempt to commit crime
 Inchoate offence
 Juvenile delinquency
 Victimless crime

Classification

By penalty 

One can categorise crimes depending on the related punishment, with sentencing tariffs prescribed in line with the perceived seriousness of the offence. Thus fines and noncustodial sentences may address the crimes seen as least serious, with lengthy imprisonment or (in some jurisdictions) capital punishment reserved for the most serious.

Common law 

Under the common law of England, crimes were classified as either treason, felony or misdemeanour, with treason sometimes being included with the felonies. This system was based on the perceived seriousness of the offence. It is still used in the United States but the distinction between felony and misdemeanour is abolished in England, Wales and Northern Ireland.

By mode of trial 

The following classes of offence are based on mode of trial:
 Indictable-only offence
 Indictable offence
 Hybrid offence, a.k.a. either-way offence in England and Wales
 Summary offence, a.k.a. infraction in the US

By origin 

In common law countries, crimes may be categorised into common law offences and statutory offences. In the US, Australia and Canada (in particular), they are divided into federal crimes and under state crimes.

Reports, studies and organizations
There are several national and International organizations offering studies and statistics about global and local crime activity, such as United Nations Office on Drugs and Crime, the United States of America Overseas Security Advisory Council (OSAC) safety report or national reports generated by the law-enforcement authorities of EU state member reported to the Europol.

"Offence" in common law jurisdictions 

In England and Wales, as well as in Hong Kong, the term "offence" means the same thing as "crime", They are further split into:
 Summary offences
 Indictable offences

Causes and correlates 

Many different causes and correlates of crime have been proposed with varying degree of empirical support. They include socioeconomic, psychological, biological, and behavioral factors. Controversial topics include media violence research and effects of gun politics.

Emotional state (both chronic and current) have a tremendous impact on individual thought processes and, as a result, can be linked to criminal activities. The positive psychology concept of Broaden and Build posits that cognitive functioning expands when an individual is in a good-feeling emotional state and contracts as emotional state declines. In positive emotional states an individual is able to consider more possible solutions to problems, but in lower emotional states fewer solutions can be ascertained. The narrowed thought-action repertoires can result in the only paths perceptible to an individual being ones they would never use if they saw an alternative, but if they can't conceive of the alternatives that carry less risk they will choose one that they can see. Criminals who commit even the most horrendous of crimes, such as mass murders, did not see another solution.

International 

Crimes defined by treaty as crimes against international law include:
 Crimes against peace
 Crimes of apartheid
 Forced disappearance
 Genocide
 Incitement to genocide
 Piracy
 Sexual slavery
 Slavery
 Torture
 Waging a war of aggression
 War crimes

From the point of view of state-centric law, extraordinary procedures (international courts or national courts operating with universal jurisdiction) may prosecute such crimes. Note the role of the International Criminal Court at The Hague in the Netherlands.

Occupational 

Two common types of employee crime exist: embezzlement and wage theft.

The complexity and anonymity of computer systems may help criminal employees camouflage their operations. The victims of the most costly scams include banks, brokerage houses, insurance companies, and other large financial institutions.

In the United States, it is estimated that $40 billion to $60 billion are lost annually due to all forms of wage theft. This compares to national annual losses of $340 million due to robbery, $4.1 billion due to burglary, $5.3 billion due to larceny, and $3.8 billion due to auto theft in 2012. In Singapore, as in the United States, wage theft was found to be widespread and severe. In a 2014 survey it was found that as many as one-third of low wage male foreign workers in Singapore, or about 130,000, were affected by wage theft from partial to full denial of pay.

Liability 

If a crime is committed, the individual responsible is considered to be liable for the crime. For liability to exist, the individual must be capable of understanding the criminal process and the relevant authority must have legitimate power to establish what constitutes a crime.

See also 

 Crime displacement
 Crime science
 Federal Crime
 Law and order (politics)
 National Museum of Crime & Punishment in Washington DC
 Organized crime (also knows as the criminal underworld)
 :Category:Age of criminal responsibility

Notes

References and further reading
 Attenborough, F.L. (ed. and trans.) (1922). The Laws of the Earliest English Kings. Cambridge: Cambridge University Press. Reprint March 2006. The Lawbook Exchange, Ltd. 
 Blythe, James M. (1992). Ideal Government and the Mixed Constitution in the Middle Ages. Princeton: Princeton University Press. 
 Cohen, Stanley (1985). Visions of Social Control: Crime, Punishment, and Classification. Polity Press. 
 Foucault, Michel (1975). Discipline and Punish: the Birth of the Prison, New York: Random House.
 Garoupa, Nuno & Klerman, Daniel. (2002). "Optimal Law Enforcement with a Rent-Seeking Government". American Law and Economics Review Vol. 4, No. 1. pp. 116–140.
 Hart, H.L.A. (1972). Law, Liberty and Morality. Stanford: Stanford University Press. 
 Hitchins, Peter. A Brief History of Crime  (2003) 2nd edition was issued as he Abolition of Liberty: The Decline of Order and Justice in England (2004)
 Kalifa, Dominique. Vice, Crime, and Poverty: How the Western Imagination Invented the Underworld (Columbia University Press, 2019) 
 Kern, Fritz. (1948). Kingship and Law in the Middle Ages. Reprint edition (1985), Westport, Conn.: Greenwood Press.
 Kramer, Samuel Noah. (1971). The Sumerians: Their History, Culture, and Character. Chicago: University of Chicago. 
 Maine, Henry Sumner. (1861). Ancient Law: Its Connection with the Early History of Society, and Its Relation to Modern Ideas. Reprint edition (1986). Tucson: University of Arizona Press. 
 Oppenheim, A. Leo (and Reiner, Erica as editor). (1964). Ancient Mesopotamia: Portrait of a Dead Civilization. Revised edition (September 15, 1977). Chicago: University of Chicago Press. 
 Pennington, Kenneth. (1993). The Prince and the Law, 1200–1600: Sovereignty and Rights in the Western Legal Tradition. Berkeley: University of California Press. 
 Polinsky, A. Mitchell. (1980). "Private versus Public Enforcement of Fines". The Journal of Legal Studies, Vol. IX, No. 1, (January), pp. 105–127.
 Polinsky, A. Mitchell & Shavell, Steven. (1997). On the Disutility and Discounting of Imprisonment and the Theory of Deterrence, NBER Working Papers 6259, National Bureau of Economic Research, Inc.
 Skaist, Aaron Jacob. (1994). The Old Babylonian Loan Contract: Its History and Geography. Ramat Gan, Israel: Bar-Ilan University Press. 
 Théry, Julien. (2011). "Atrocitas/enormitas. Esquisse pour une histoire de la catégorie de 'crime énorme' du Moyen Âge à l'époque moderne", Clio@Themis, Revue électronique d'histoire du droit, n. 4 
 Tierney, Brian. (1979). Church Law and Constitutional Thought in the Middle Ages. London: Variorum Reprints. 
 
 Vinogradoff, Paul. (1909). Roman Law in Medieval Europe. Reprint edition (2004). Kessinger Publishing Co.

External links 

 

 
Criminal law
 
Morality